Hellinsia katangae is a moth of the family Pterophoridae. It is found in the Democratic Republic of the Congo (Haut-Katanga).

References

Moths described in 2009
katangae
Fauna of the Democratic Republic of the Congo
Moths of Africa
Insects of the Democratic Republic of the Congo
Endemic fauna of the Democratic Republic of the Congo